Carex cockayneana, also known as Cockayne's sedge, is a tussock-forming perennial in the family Cyperaceae, that is native to the North Island of New Zealand..

The specific epithet honours the New Zealand botanist Leonard Cockayne.

See also
 List of Carex species

References

cockayneana
Plants described in 1906
Taxa named by Georg Kükenthal
Flora of New Zealand